Ravenfield is a civil parish in the Metropolitan Borough of Rotherham, South Yorkshire, England.  The parish contains nine listed buildings that are recorded in the National Heritage List for England.  Of these, one is listed at Grade II*, the middle of the three grades, and the others are at Grade II, the lowest grade.  The parish contains the village of Ravenfield and the surrounding countryside.  Four of the listed buildings are houses along the main street, and to the north of the village is a church.  The other listed buildings are further to the north, and are associated with Ravenfield Hall, which was destroyed by fire in 1963.


Key

Buildings

References

Citations

Sources

 

Lists of listed buildings in South Yorkshire
Buildings and structures in the Metropolitan Borough of Rotherham